Quiet room or silent room may refer to:

Rooms 
 Anechoic chamber, a room designed to absorb reflections of either sound or electromagnetic waves
 Padded cell, a cell in a psychiatric hospital with cushions lining the walls
 Quiet room, a room in an office built with regard to silence by shielding noise from or towards the surroundings

Film and television 
 A Quiet Place, a 2018 American science fiction horror film
 A Quiet Place Part II, a 2021 American horror film
 The Quiet Room (1996 film), an Australian drama film
 The Quiet Room (2018 film), an American short horror film

Literature 
 The Quiet Room, a location in the Marvel Comics series Inhumans
 The Quiet Room: A Journey Out of the Torment of Madness, a 1994 book by Amanda Bennett and Lori Schiller.
 Welcome to the Quiet Room, a Japanese comedy-drama released in 2007

Music 
 In a Quiet Room, 1995 country music album by Dan Seals
 In a Quiet Room II, 1998 country music album by Dan Seals
 In My Quiet Room, 1966 album by Harry Belafonte
 "The Quiet Room", a song by Alice Cooper from his 1978 album From the Inside

See also 
 The Room (disambiguation)